Przynotecko  is a village in the administrative district of Gmina Stare Kurowo, within Strzelce-Drezdenko County, Lubusz Voivodeship, in western Poland.

References

Przynotecko